Rakówka may refer to the following places:
Rakówka, Greater Poland Voivodeship (west-central Poland)
Rakówka, Lublin Voivodeship (east Poland)
Rakówka, Świętokrzyskie Voivodeship (south-central Poland)